In the United States, Office of Inspector General (OIG) is a generic term for the oversight division of a federal or state agency aimed at preventing inefficient or unlawful operations within their parent agency. Such offices are attached to many federal executive departments, independent federal agencies, as well as state and local governments. Each office includes an inspector general (or I.G.) and employees charged with identifying, auditing, and investigating fraud, waste, abuse, embezzlement and mismanagement of any kind within the executive department.

History
In the United States, other than in the military departments, the first Office of Inspector General was established by act of Congress in 1976 under the Department of Health and Human Services to eliminate waste, fraud, and abuse in Medicare, Medicaid, and more than 100 other departmental programs. With approximately 1,600 employees, the HHS-OIG performs audits, investigations, and evaluations to recommend policy for decision-makers and the public.

Ronald Reagan terminated 16 inspectors general when he entered into office in 1981. His administration explained that Reagan intended to hire his own selections. After Congress objected, Reagan rehired 5 of those terminated.

George H. W. Bush also attempted to dismiss all the inspectors general when he became president in 1989, but relented after the inspectors general and Congress objected.

Barack Obama dismissed Corporation for National and Community Service inspector general Gerald Walpin citing a lack of confidence in him. After Congress objected to his lack of explanation, the Obama administration cited that Walpin had shown "troubling and inappropriate conduct", and pointed to an incident that year when Walpin was "disoriented" during a board meeting of the Corporation, because of which the board requested Walpin's dismissal. Walpin sued for reinstatement, but the courts ruled against him.

In 2020, Donald Trump dismissed or replaced five inspectors general within six weeks. Two permanent inspectors general were dismissed and three acting inspectors general were replaced. Just after firing intelligence inspector general Michael Atkinson, Trump criticized Atkinson as having done a "terrible job" and that he "took a fake report and he brought it to Congress", in reference to the whistleblower complaint of the Trump–Ukraine scandal, which other testimony and evidence largely verified. Trump also described Atkinson as "not a big Trump fan". Around one month before Trump replaced Christi Grimm as acting health inspector general, he had called her report of shortages of medical supplies in American hospitals during the COVID-19 pandemic in the United States as "wrong", "fake", and "her opinion", despite the report being based on a survey of 323 hospitals. Trump also questioned Grimm's motives for the report.

Authority

The Inspector General Act of 1978 created 12 departmental inspectors general. Thirty years later, in October 2008, the Inspector General Reform Act of 2008 added IGs in various other areas. , there were 72 statutory IGs.

The offices employ special agents (criminal investigators, often armed) and auditors. In addition, federal offices of inspectors general employ forensic auditors, or "audigators", evaluators, inspectors, administrative investigators, and a variety of other specialists. Their activities include the detection and prevention of fraud, waste, abuse, and mismanagement of the government programs and operations within their parent organizations. Office investigations may be internal, targeting government employees, or external, targeting grant recipients, contractors, or recipients of the various loans and subsidies offered through the thousands of federal domestic and foreign assistance programs. The Inspector General Reform Act of 2008 (IGRA) amended the 1978 act by increasing pay and various powers and creating the Council of the Inspectors General on Integrity and Efficiency (CIGIE).

Some inspectors general, the heads of the offices, are appointed by the president and confirmed by the Senate. For example, both the inspector general of the U.S. Department of Labor and the inspector general of the U.S. Agency for International Development are presidentially appointed. The remaining inspectors general are designated by their respective agency heads, such as the U.S. Postal Service inspector general. Presidentially appointed IGs can only be removed, or terminated, from their positions by the President of the United States, whereas designated inspectors general can be terminated by the agency head. However, in both cases Congress must be notified of the termination, removal, or reassignment.

While the IG Act of 1978 requires that inspectors general be selected based upon their qualifications and not political affiliation, presidentially appointed inspectors general are considered political appointees and are often selected, if only in part and in addition to their qualifications, because of their political relationships and party affiliation. An example of the role political affiliation plays in the selection of an inspector general, and the resulting pitfalls, can be seen in the 2001 Republican appointment (and resignation under fire) of Janet Rehnquist (daughter of former Chief Justice of the United States, William Rehnquist) to the post of inspector general for the U.S. Department of Health and Human Services.

While all of the federal offices of inspectors general operate separately from one another, they share information and some coordination through the Council of Inspectors General on Integrity and Efficiency. , the CIGIE comprised 68 offices. In addition to their inspector general members, the CIGIE includes non-inspector general representatives from the federal executive branch, such as executives from the Office of Management and Budget, the Office of Personnel Management, the Office of Government Ethics, the Office of Special Counsel, and the Federal Bureau of Investigation. The CIGIE also provides specialized training to the inspector general community.

Further evidence of coordination between federal offices of inspectors general can be seen by the public through the offices' shared website, and the use of shared training facilities and resources, such as the Inspector General Criminal Investigator Academy (IGCIA), and their Inspector General Community Auditor Training Team (IGCATS), which are hosted by the U.S. Department of Homeland Security's Federal Law Enforcement Training Center (FLETC).

Evidence of the offices' return on investment to taxpayers can be seen through their semi-annual reports to Congress, most of which are available on each office's website.

Since the post-9/11 enactment of the Homeland Security Act of 2002, resulting in the amendment of the IG Act of 1978, Section 6e, most presidentially appointed IG special agents have had full law enforcement authority to carry firearms, make arrests, and execute search warrants. Prior to this time, most presidentially appointed IG and some designated IG special agents had the equivalent law enforcement authorities as a result of other statutes or annually required deputation by the U.S. Marshals Service. The 2002 amendment to the IG Act of 1978 made most deputation of presidentially appointed IG special agents unnecessary. Some designated IG special agents, however, still have full law enforcement authority today by virtue of this continued deputation. Some OIGs employ no criminal investigators and rely solely on administrative investigators, auditors, and inspectors.

Lists of inspectors general

Presidentially-appointed, Senate-confirmed (PAS) inspectors general

Establishment inspectors general

Special inspectors general

Vacancies and pending nominations 
Announced nominations for unfilled PAS IGs awaiting confirmation in the Senate.

List of presidentially-appointed inspectors general

Afghanistan Reconstruction (Special)

Agency for International Development

Department of Agriculture

Central Intelligence Agency

Department of Commerce

Corporation for National and Community Service

Department of Defense

Department of Education

Department of Energy

Environmental Protection Agency

Export-Import Bank

Federal Communications Commission

Federal Deposit Insurance Corporation

Federal Emergency Management Agency

Federal Housing Finance Agency

General Services Administration

Department of Health and Human Services

Department of Homeland Security

Department of Housing and Urban Development

Intelligence Community

Department of the Interior

Internal Revenue Service

Department of Justice

Department of Labor

National Aeronautics and Space Administration

National Reconnaissance Office

National Security Agency

Nuclear Regulatory Commission

Pandemic Recovery (Special)

Office of Personnel Management

Railroad Retirement Board

Resolution Trust Corporation

Small Business Administration

Social Security Administration

Department of State

Tennessee Valley Authority

Department of Transportation

Department of the Treasury

Troubled Assets Relief Program (Special)

U.S. Information Agency

Department of Veterans Affairs

Designated federal entity (DFE) inspectors general

List of DFE IGs

Appalachian Regional Commission

Architect of the Capitol

Capitol Police

Committee for Purchase from People Who Are Blind or Severely Disabled

Commodity Futures Trading Commission

Consumer Product Safety Commission

Corporation for Public Broadcasting

Denali Commission

Election Assistance Commission

Equal Employment Opportunity Commission

Farm Credit Administration

Federal Election Commission

Federal Labor Relations Authority

Federal Maritime Commission

Federal Reserve Board

Federal Trade Commission

Government Accountability Office

Government Publishing Office

House of Representatives

International Development Finance Corporation

International Trade Commission

Iraq Reconstruction (Special)

Legal Services Corporation

Library of Congress

National Archives and Records Administration

National Credit Union Administration

National Endowment for the Arts

National Endowment for the Humanities

National Labor Relations Board

National Railroad Passenger Corporation

National Science Foundation

Panama Canal Commission

Peace Corps

Pension Benefit Guaranty Corporation

Postal Regulatory Commission

Postal Service

Securities and Exchange Commission

Smithsonian Institution

Tennessee Valley Authority

Legislative agency inspectors general

U.S. military
Within the United States Armed Forces, the position of inspector general is normally part of the personal staff serving a general or flag officer in a command position. The inspector general's office functions in two ways. To a certain degree they are ombudsmen for their branch of service. However, their primary function is to ensure the combat readiness of subordinate units in their command.

An armed services inspector general also investigates noncriminal allegations and some specific criminal allegations, to include determining if the matter should be referred for criminal investigation by the service's criminal investigative agency.

The Air Force Inspector General Complaints Program was established to address the concerns of Air Force active duty, reserve, and Guard members, civilian employees, family members, and retirees, as well as the interest of the Air Force. One of the first responsibilities of the Air Force inspector general is to operate a credible complaints program that investigates personnel complaints: Fraud, Waste, and Abuse (FWA) allegations; congressional inquiries; and issues involving the Air Force mission. Personnel complaints and FWA disclosures to the IG help commanders correct problems that affect the productivity, mission accomplishment, and morale of assigned personnel, which are areas of high concern to Air Force leaders at all levels.

Former
ACTION
Arms Control and Disarmament Agency (concurrent with State Department)
Coalition Provisional Authority
Federal Emergency Management Agency
U.S. Information Agency
Iraq Reconstruction (Special)
Panama Canal Commission
Resolution Trust Corporation

Review boards
Pandemic Response Accountability Committee
Recovery Accountability and Transparency Board

Stark Law and Anti-Kickback Statute enforcement

HHS-OIG develops and distributes resources to assist the health care industry in its efforts to comply with the nation's fraud and abuse laws and to educate the public about fraudulent schemes so that it can protect itself and report suspicious activities.

Recently, HHS-OIG has targeted hospitals and healthcare systems for Stark Law and Anti-Kickback Statute violations pertaining to the management of physician compensation arrangements. In 2015, a fraud alert was issued to publicize the OIG's intent to further regulate such non-compliance. In light of such efforts and consequent record-breaking settlements, healthcare experts have begun to call for the transition from paper-based physician time logging and contract management to automated solutions.

Criticism
Inspectors general have also been criticized for being ineffective and persecuting whistleblowers rather than protecting them. One example is from the Securities and Exchange Commission OIG. In a 2011 article by Matt Taibbi, SEC whistleblowers said that complaining to the SEC OIG was "well-known to be a career-killer". Another example is from whistleblower Jesselyn Radack's book Canary in the Coalmine, in which she describes her experience complaining to the Department of Justice OIG; instead of helping her, the IG office helped the DOJ get her fired and restricted from practicing as a lawyer. Another example is from the Thomas Andrews Drake case, in which several complainants to the Department of Defense OIG over NSA's Trailblazer Project were later raided by the FBI and some threatened with criminal prosecution.

See also

 Federal law enforcement in the United States
 2020 dismissal of inspectors general

Explanatory notes

Citations

Further reading

External links
 
Inspector General Vacancy Tracker by Project On Government Oversight (POGO)

1976 establishments in the United States
Federal government of the United States
United S